Mariarosaria Rossi (born March 8, 1972 in Piedimonte Matese) is an Italian politician.

Biography
She became an entrepreneur in the field of debt collection with the "Euro Service Group" of her husband at the time, Antonio Persici, from whom she has a son named Lorenzo.

Her first political experience was at the District Council in the 10th Municipality of Rome in 2006. In 2008 she was elected MP at the Chamber of Deputies, while in 2013 she has been elected Senator.

On 20 May 2014, she replaced Sandro Bondi as special party commissioner with the task of cutting costs and signing the nominations. Within two years she was able to reduce the debt from 12 to 3.5 million euros. On 2 March 2016 she was appointed commissioner of the party in Caserta and province

She is known with the nickname "La badante" ("The caregiver"), as she personally assisted Silvio Berlusconi in each of his private and public releases and together with Giovanni Toti, Francesca Pascale, Alessia Ardesi and Deborah Bergamini forms the so-called Berlusconi's "magic circle". 
Following the operation at Berlusconi's heart, the women are removed from the family council (the sons, Gianni Letta, Fedele Confalonieri and Niccolò Ghedini) because they are found guilty of his stress; on 29 June 29, 2016, Rossi resigned as party commissioner being replaced by Alfredo Messina and at the same time she was appointed Treasurer of the Forza Italia Group in the Senate. In December she returned to Berlusconi's "court" to take care of "minor commissions and house management".

Judicial proceedings
In 2010 some wiretapping in the investigations of the judicial police, revealed her usual participation in the bunga bunga dinners organized in the residence of Arcore of the prime minister Silvio Berlusconi. 
On 24 June 2013, as part of the process of extortion and child prostitution to Silvio Berlusconi, the minutes of Rossi's deposition were transmitted to the prosecution to assess whether or not the conditions existed to be investigated for perjury.
On 30 June 2015, the Milan Public Prosecutor announced the end of the investigation notice to 34 suspects, including Rossi, accused of perjury in the "Ruby Ter" investigation into the Arcore dinners. 
On 19 October 2016 she has been committed for trial together with 22 other people.

References

1972 births
Living people
People from Piedimonte Matese
Forza Italia politicians
The People of Freedom politicians
Forza Italia (2013) politicians
Deputies of Legislature XVI of Italy
Senators of Legislature XVII of Italy
Senators of Legislature XVIII of Italy
Politicians of Campania
21st-century Italian women
20th-century Italian women
Women members of the Chamber of Deputies (Italy)
Women members of the Senate of the Republic (Italy)